East Camden is an unincorporated area and census-designated place (CDP) in Kershaw County, South Carolina, United States. It was first listed as a CDP prior to the 2020 census with a population of 3,215.

East Camden is in south-central Kershaw County, bordered to the southwest and south by the city of Camden, the county seat. The CDP includes the community of Du Bose Park. U.S. Route 1 passes through the CDP, leading southwest into Camden and northeast  to Bethune.

Demographics

2020 census

Note: the US Census treats Hispanic/Latino as an ethnic category. This table excludes Latinos from the racial categories and assigns them to a separate category. Hispanics/Latinos can be of any race.

References 

Census-designated places in Kershaw County, South Carolina
Census-designated places in South Carolina